Hair defect-photosensitivity-intellectual disability, also known as Calderon-Gonzalez-Cantu syndrome is a rare syndrome characterized by fragile hair, photosensitive eyebrows and eyelashes and intellectual disability which doesn't progress, and no metabolic aberration. Only three sisters that were born to consanguineous parents have been described in medical literature.

References

Syndromes with intellectual disability
Rare syndromes